Giovanna Júlly Lopes Chaves (born December 4, 2001) is a Brazilian actress, singer and songwriter. She is best known for her role on Cúmplices de um Resgate, in which she played one of the antagonists, Priscila.

Biography and career 
Chaves was born on December 4, 2001, in the municipality of São Paulo, in Brazil. Giovanna has a sister named Bruna. She started her career at 9 months of age, when she participated in the recording of a DVD of the show Gugu. She did advertising work, fashion shows, catalogs and participated in some television programs, including Ídolos Kids and Programa do Gugu. Today, Giovanna is known for acting in Cúmplices de um Resgate, giving life to antagonist Priscilla.

Musical career 
After having participated in the Ídolos Kids program, she released their first CD called Giovanna Chaves in 2012. The soundtrack of more success was to Imaginar that was part of the soundtrack of the novel Chiquititas. Along with the success of the Cúmplices de um Resgate novel of a rescue, Giovanna released his second CD called Vem Comigo in 2016 in which is very successful among young people from all over Brazil.

Filmography

Television

Film

Videoclips

Literature

Discography

Giovanna Chaves (2014)
Vem Comigo (2016)

Soundtrack
2013 (Chiquititas) – "Imaginar"
2016 (Cúmplices de um Resgate) –  "Superstar" (with Larissa Manoela and choir)
2013 (Cúmplices de um Resgate) – "Juntos" (with Larissa Manoela and choir)

Awards and nominations

References

External links

2001 births
Living people
People from São Paulo
Brazilian television actresses
Brazilian female models
Actresses from São Paulo
21st-century Brazilian singers
21st-century Brazilian women singers